Euphemia "Effie" Newbigging Richardson (née Johnstone, 1849 – 27 December 1928) was a New Zealand landowner and litigant. She was born in Kilmeny, Islay, Argyllshire, Scotland in about 1849.

She died in Nelson in 1928 and was buried in Wakapuaka Cemetery.

References

1849 births
1928 deaths
People from Argyll and Bute
Scottish emigrants to New Zealand
People from Nelson, New Zealand
Burials at Wakapuaka Cemetery